Hermann Theodor Wangemann (27 March 1818 – 18 June 1894) was a German theologian and missionary.

Wangemann's father, Johannes Theodosius, arrived with his family in Demmin in Pomerania around 1821, where he became a subrector and later received the title of music director. Hermann Theodor attended the town school here, followed by the Gymnasium in Berlin from 1832 to 1836. After studying theology at the University of Berlin, Wangemann first held a position as a house teacher in Bern from 1840 to 1844. During this time he was awarded a doctorate in Theology by the University of Halle. From 1845 he worked as a rector and assistant teacher in Wollin, Farther Pomerania (Hinterpommern).

After becoming a seminary director and Archidiakon in Cammin in 1849, he was actively involved in the Erweckungsbewegung (revival movement). From 1858 he edited the monthly magazine for the Protestant Lutheran Church of Prussia. In 1865 he was appointed director of the Berlin Missionary Society, one of four German Protestant mission societies active in 19th and 20th century South Africa. From 1866 onwards Wangemann visited the mission offices in Africa and was editor of the Berlin Mission reports. In his book Maleo und Sekukuni – Ein Lebensbild aus Südafrika, he describes his first journey (1866-67) through the territory of the Berlin Missionary Society in South Africa. A second journey followed in 1884-85 to celebrate the golden jubilee of the first Berlin Mission Society station in South Africa at Bethanie. The mission station Wangemannshöh in German East Africa was named after him.

Wangemann married three times during his life. His first wife died during child birth and his second after a prolonged illness, but his third marriage was a long and happy one.

References 

1818 births
1894 deaths
19th-century German theologians
Humboldt University of Berlin alumni
Martin Luther University of Halle-Wittenberg alumni
German Lutheran missionaries
German Lutheran theologians
People from Prignitz
People from Demmin